Mark Anthony Suárez (born January 8, 1979) is an American former professional boxer who challenged for the IBF welterweight title in 2006.

Amateur career
Mark's father Andy Suárez trained him until his death. During his amateur career Suárez won a National Amateur Championship and was a two-time National Golden Gloves champion.

Professional career
In May 2005, Suárez defeated an undefeated Viktor Sydorenko to win the WBO NABO welterweight title.

IBF welterweight title challenge
On October 28, 2006, Suárez lost to Kermit Cintrón. This bout was for the vacant IBF welterweight title.

Professional boxing record

References

http://www.boxnews.com.ua/en/news/2637/2006-05-16/IBF-ORDERS-MAYWEATHER-SUAREZ-

External links

American boxers of Mexican descent
Boxers from California
Sportspeople from Riverside, California
Welterweight boxers
1979 births
Living people
American male boxers